PPI may refer to:

Science and technology

Biochemistry
 PPi, the anion P2O74−, a pyrophosphate
 Polyproline I helix, a type of polyproline helix
 Protein–protein interaction

Medicine
 Patient package insert, a document to be provided to a patient providing details of their medication
 Patients and public involvement (PPI), a UK healthcare initiative
 Prepulse inhibition, of a later pulse
 Proton-pump inhibitor, of gastric acid secretion
 Psychopathic Personality Inventory, a personality test
 Psychophysiological Interaction, fMRI analysis technique

Computing
 Parallel Peripheral Interface, of the Blackfin processor
 Programmable Peripheral Interface, Intel 8255 chip
 Programmable Peripheral Interconnect, an implementation of autonomous peripheral operations in microcontrollers
 Pixels per inch, number of pixels per inch in a display

Other science and technology
 Pulsational pair-instability supernova
 Gabarit passe-partout international, in railways
 Picks per inch, a unit of textile measurement
 Plan position indicator, radar display
 Polymethylene polyphenylene isocyanate

Business and organizations
 Italian People's Party (1919) (Partito Popolare Italiano), a Christian-democratic party
 Italian People's Party (1994) (Partito Popolare Italiano), a Christian-democratic party
 Peace Party of India, Uttar Pradesh
 Perusahaan Perdagangan Indonesia, Indonesian trading company
 Philips Phonographische Industries, later Philips Records
 Phonographic Performance Ireland, Irish music performance rights organisation
 Pirate Parties International, organisation for Pirate Parties
 Polly Peck International, UK company collapsed in 1991
 Primarily Primates, primate sanctuary, Texas, US
 Productivity Products International, US software company later renamed Stepstone
 Progressive Policy Institute, a U.S. public policy think tank
 Pakistan Press International, a Pakistani news agency

Other uses
 Pareto priority index, to prioritize projects
 Payment protection insurance
 Positive polarity item
 Producer price index  a price index that measures the average changes in prices received by domestic producers for their output.
 Pre-purchase inspection
 Pulse polio immunization
 Port Pirie Airport, IATA airport code "PPI"